On 15 May 1999, NATO aircraft bombed the village of Koriša, Kosovo during the NATO bombing of Yugoslavia. At least 87 civilians were killed and 60 wounded. NATO officials affirmed before and after the bombing that the bombing was on a legitimate military target.

Aftermath
After the bombing, Serbian officials took TV crews to the scene and later Serbian television showed scenes of devastation, bodies burned beyond recognition and charred tractors scattered at the scene of the attack. The Yugoslav government insisted that NATO had targeted civilians, while Kosovo Albanian survivors claimed that they had been set up by Yugoslav authorities as human shields so that they would be killed by NATO bombs.

The incident occurred near Koriša, a village near the southern city of Prizren.

References

External links 
Yugoslavia says village death toll tops 100

Aerial operations and battles of the Kosovo War
Civilian casualties in the Kosovo War
Incidents involving NATO
May 1999 events in Europe
1999 crimes in Kosovo
Mass murder in 1999
History of Prizren
NATO airstrikes
United States war crimes